The Westminster Presbyterian Church in the United States (WPCUS) was a Presbyterian denomination, founded in United States in 2006, by Rev. Brian Schwertley, formerly affiliated with Covenant Reformed Presbyterian Church and other pastors formerly affiliated with other Presbyterian denominations. The founders were particularly concerned with the perceived spread of liberal teaching within Presbyterianism in the United States and in particular with Federal Vision theology, which they believe supplies a different understanding of doctrines such as justification and the perseverance of the saints.

The denomination existed until the 2010s. After that, some of its churches joined Reformed Presbyterian Church of North America, others Reformed Presbyterian Church - Hanover Presbytery and others remained independent.

History 

In the 1990s, Rev. Brian Schwertley served as an associate pastor at Reformed Presbyterian Church of North America. In this period, he planted churches in the Great Lakes region.

In 2001, Schwertley was received as pastor by the Reformed Presbyterian Church in the United States and in 2004, he became pastor of the Reformed Presbyterian Church of Manawa, linked to the Covenant Reformed Presbyterian Church (CRPC).

However, in 2006, the local church split from the CRPC and, together with pastors and churches that split from the Presbyterian Church in America and Orthodox Presbyterian Church, started a new denomination called Westminster Presbyterian Church in the United States. United States (WPCUS).

In 2008, the denomination reached its peak, with 7 federated churches.

In 2014, churches previously linked to the denomination formed the Westminster Evangelical Presbyterian Church.

The denomination existed until the 2010s. After that, some of its churches joined Reformed Presbyterian Church of North America, others Reformed Presbyterian Church - Hanover Presbytery and others remained independent.

Doctrine 

The WPCUS subscribed to the Apostles' Creed, Athanasian Creed and Niceno-Constantinopolitan Creed.

In addition, he subscribed to the Westminster Confession of Faith, Westminster Larger Catechism and Westminster Shorter Catechism.

It differed from other Presbyterian denominations by adopting Exclusive Psalmody, Complementarianism, Theonomy, Young Earth Creationism and by opposing Women's ordination.

The WPCUS strictly subscribes to the Westminster Standards (The Westminster Confession of Faith, the Larger Catechism, the Shorter Catechism, the Directory of Public Worship, the Directory for Family Worship, and the Form of Presbyterian Church Government) as they were originally adopted by the Church of Scotland (1645–48) and the colonies of North America (1716).

Distinctives
Regarding its doctrine, the WPCUS:
 rejected all perceived variations from the Westminster Standards on the doctrine of justification by grace alone through faith alone.
 adhere to young earth creationism in which creation took place within the space of six 24-hour days.
 believed in complementarianism and rejects the ordination of women to church offices (elder and deacon).
 adhere to and teaches that all nations have a moral obligation explicitly to recognize Jesus as king and supreme lawgiver in their constitutions, courts, legislatures, etc. and that the civil government has the duty to legislate in conformity with God’s moral law summarized in the Ten Commandments. Consequently, they work for the restoration of the establishment of the Christian faith in the United States and reject religious pluralism, secularism, and governmental authority that is not divinely mandated in accordance with their understanding of the Westminster Standards and the principles of the Solemn League and Covenant. (Compare Covenanting and Established Church.)

Additionally, the WPCUS adhere to the following distinctives related to public worship:

 A strict interpretation of the regulative principle of worship;
 The exclusive use of the biblical Psalter for public worship, unaccompanied by musical instruments ;
 The rejection of the ecclesiastical calendar and holy days;
 The rejection of traditional prayer books and liturgies.

References 

Former Presbyterian denominations
Christian organizations established in 2006
Presbyterian denominations established in the 21st century